Bloomfield is an unincorporated community in Muskingum County, in the U.S. state of Ohio.

History
Bloomfield was laid out and platted in 1853. The community was named for blooming orchard fields near the original town site. The post office at Bloomfield was called Sago. The Sago post office was established in 1857, and remained in operation until 1902.

References

Unincorporated communities in Muskingum County, Ohio
1853 establishments in Ohio
Populated places established in 1853
Unincorporated communities in Ohio